Inge Andersen (born 22 May 1964) is a Norwegian sports coach and sports official.

Andersen was born in Bergen. He coached the Switzerland national cross-country team from 1994 to 1996. From 1998 to 2001 he was assigned with the Norwegian Ski Federation as coach and manager for the Norway women's national cross-country team. He was appointed secretary-general for the Norwegian Olympic and Paralympic Committee and Confederation of Sports in 2004. He was sacked in March 2017.

References

1964 births
Living people
Sportspeople from Bergen
Norwegian cross-country skiing coaches
Norwegian expatriate sportspeople in Switzerland
Norwegian sports executives and administrators